Lovelines is the posthumous thirteenth studio album by American music duo Carpenters, the third Carpenters album released after the death of Karen Carpenter. It was released in 1989 and is a compilation album assembled by Richard Carpenter from unreleased Carpenters tracks along with selected solo tracks by Karen from her then-unreleased solo album.

Background
The songs on Lovelines were primarily gleaned from Carpenters television specials. "When I Fall in Love" was originally recorded in 1978 for their TV special, Space Encounters. However, they chose "Little Girl Blue" for that special instead, and later used "When I Fall in Love" in their Music, Music, Music! TV special in 1980. Other outtakes included "Kiss Me the Way You Did Last Night" and "The Uninvited Guest" from Made in America, the studio album released in 1981 and the last completed during Karen's lifetime.

Between 1989 and 2019, Lovelines was also the last Carpenters album to be issued in the vinyl LP format; in 2019 Carpenters with the Royal Philharmonic Orchestra was released on LP.

Critical reception
Rolling Stone wrote that "as Karen's cozy contralto pulses through the come-hither 'Lovelines', the hearth-warm 'If We Try' ... and the saltier 'If I Had You', her vocals come damn close to soulful."

Track listing

Singles
"Honolulu City Lights"
US 7" single (1986) A&M 8667
"Honolulu City Lights"
"I Just Fall in Love Again"

"Honolulu City Lights"
Japan CD single (1986) A&M 8667
"Honolulu City Lights"
"Slow Dance"

"If I Had You" (issued as a Karen Carpenter solo)
US Cassette single (1989) A&M TS 1471
"If I Had You"
"The Uninvited Guest"

US CD Single Promo (1989)
”If I Had You” (no B-side)

JP 7" promo (1989) SSP-75
"If I Had You"
"Lovelines"

"When I Fall in Love"
PH 7" single (1989) AM-90-133
"When I Fall in Love"
"Remember When Lovin' Took All Night"

EPs
Four selections from Carpenters: The 12 Compact Disc Collection
UK CD promo (1989) SAMP1989
"You're the One"
"(They Long to Be) Close to You"
"Goodbye to Love"
"Merry Christmas Darling"

Charts

References

The Carpenters albums
1989 albums
Albums produced by Phil Ramone
A&M Records albums
Albums published posthumously
Albums recorded at A&M Studios